Mj bakeri is a species of moth in the family Sphingidae. It was described by Benjamin Preston Clark in 1929 and is known from the Philippines.

References

Ambulyx
Moths described in 1929
Moths of Asia